The Rossel Mountains are a range of mountains on the island of New Ireland, part of Papua New Guinea.  They are home to deposits of chalk limestone, from which the kulap figures native to the island are crafted.

References
Geonames.org

Mountain ranges of Papua New Guinea